The doubling time is the time it takes for a population to double in size/value. It is applied to population growth, inflation, resource extraction, consumption of goods, compound interest, the volume of malignant tumours, and many other things that tend to grow over time.  When the relative growth rate (not the absolute growth rate) is constant, the quantity undergoes exponential growth and has a constant doubling time or period, which can be calculated directly from the growth rate.

This time can be calculated by dividing the natural logarithm of 2 by the exponent of growth, or approximated by dividing 70 by the percentage growth rate (more roughly but roundly, dividing 72; see the rule of 72 for details and derivations of this formula).

The doubling time is a characteristic unit (a natural unit of scale) for the exponential growth equation, and its converse for exponential decay is the half-life.

For example, given Canada's net population growth of 0.9% in the year 2006, dividing 70 by 0.9 gives an approximate doubling time of 78 years. Thus if the growth rate remains constant, Canada's population would double from its 2006 figure of 33 million to 66 million by 2084.

History 
The notion of doubling time dates to interest on loans in Babylonian mathematics. Clay tablets from circa 2000 BCE include the exercise "Given an interest rate of 1/60 per month (no compounding), come the doubling time." This yields an annual interest rate of 12/60 = 20%, and hence a doubling time of 100% growth/20% growth per year = 5 years. Further, repaying double the initial amount of a loan, after a fixed time, was common commercial practice of the period: a common Assyrian loan of 1900 BCE consisted of loaning 2 minas of gold, getting back 4 in five years, and an Egyptian proverb of the time was "If wealth is placed where it bears interest, it comes back to you redoubled."

Examination

Examining the doubling time can give a more intuitive sense of the long-term impact of growth than simply viewing the percentage growth rate.

For a constant growth rate of r % within time t, the formula for the doubling time Td  is given by

Some doubling times calculated with this formula are shown in this table.

Simple doubling time formula:

where

 N(t) = the number of objects at time t
 Td = doubling period (time it takes for object to double in number)
 N0 = initial number of objects
 t = time

For example, with an annual growth rate of 4.8% the doubling time is 14.78 years, and a doubling time of 10 years corresponds to a growth rate between 7% and 7.5% (actually about 7.18%).

When applied to the constant growth in consumption of a resource, the total amount consumed in one doubling period equals the total amount consumed in all previous periods. This enabled U.S. President Jimmy Carter to note in a speech in 1977 that in each of the previous two decades the world had used more oil than in all of previous history (The roughly exponential growth in world oil consumption between 1950 and 1970 had a doubling period of under a decade).

Given two measurements of a growing quantity, q1 at time t1 and q2 at time t2, and assuming a constant growth rate, the doubling time can be calculated as

Where it is useful

Constant relative growth rate means simply that the increase per unit time is proportional to the current quantity, i.e. the addition rate per unit amount is constant.  It naturally occurs when the existing material generates or is the main determinant of new material.  For example, population growth in virgin territory, or fractional-reserve banking creating inflation.  With unvarying growth the doubling calculation may be applied for many doubling periods or generations.

In practice eventually other constraints become important, exponential growth stops and the doubling time changes or becomes inapplicable. Limited food supply or other resources at high population densities will reduce growth, or needing a wheel-barrow full of notes to buy a loaf of bread will reduce the acceptance of paper money.  While using doubling times is convenient and simple, we should not apply the idea without considering factors which may affect future growth.  In the 1950s Canada's population growth rate was over 3% per year, so extrapolating the current growth rate of 0.9% for many decades (implied by the doubling time) is unjustified unless we have examined the underlying causes of the growth and determined they will not be changing significantly over that period.

Related concepts
The equivalent concept to doubling time for a material undergoing a constant negative relative growth rate or exponential decay is the half-life.

The equivalent concept in base-e is e-folding.

Cell culture doubling time 

Cell doubling time can be calculated in the following way using growth rate (amount of doubling in one unit of time)

Growth rate:

or

where

  = the number of cells at time t
  = the number of cells at time 0
  = growth rate
  = time (usually in hours)

Doubling time:

The following is the known doubling time for the following cells:

See also
 Albert Allen Bartlett
 Binary logarithm
 e-folding
 Exponential decay
 Exponential growth
 Half-life
 Relative growth rate
 Rule of 72

References

Reference 6 is controversial.

See:-
https://www.statnews.com/2018/10/14/harvard-brigham-retractions-stem-cell/
https://www.nytimes.com/2018/10/15/health/piero-anversa-fraud-retractions.html

External links 
 Doubling Time Calculator
 http://geography.about.com/od/populationgeography/a/populationgrow.htm

Population ecology
Temporal exponentials
Economic growth
Epidemiology
Mathematics in medicine